Nick White may refer to:

 Nick White (musician), musician with Tilly and the Wall
 Nick White (dog trainer), celebrity dog trainer
 Nic White, Australian rugby union player
 Nick White (rugby union), New Zealand rugby union player